The 2014–15 Hellenic Football League season was the 62nd in the history of the Hellenic Football League, a football competition in England.

Premier Division

Premier Division featured 18 clubs which competed in the division last season, along with two new clubs:
Milton United, promoted from Division One East
Thatcham Town, resigned from the Southern Football League

League table

Results

Division One East

Division One East featured eleven clubs which competed in the division last season, along with three new clubs:
Brackley Town development
Easington Sports, transferred from Division One West
Old Woodstock Town, transferred from Division One West

League table

Results

Division One West

Division One West featured twelve clubs which competed in the division last season, along with three new clubs:
Cirencester Town development, promoted from Division Two West
Longlevens, promoted from the Gloucestershire County League
Wantage Town reserves, promoted from Division Two West

League table

Results

Division Two East

Division Two East featured eleven clubs which competed in the division last season, along with two new clubs:
 Flackwell Heath reserves
 Stokenchurch

League table

Division Two West

Division Two West featured nine clubs which competed in the division last season, along with four new clubs:
Abingdon United reserves, joined from the North Berks League
Clanfield reserves, joined from the North Berks League
Kidlington reserves, joined from the Oxfordshire Senior League
Letcombe reserves

League table

 Five games were not played: Old Woodstock Town Reserves v Oxford City Nomads Development (abandoned, no replay); Oxford City Nomads Development v Clanfield Reserves (home win awarded); Fairford Town Reserves v Hook Norton Reserves (home win awarded); Abingdon United Reserves v Fairford Town Reserves (away win awarded); Oxford City Nomads Development v Shrivenham Reserves (home win awarded).

External links
 Official Site

2014-15
9